Lady Marina Charlotte Alexandra Katharine Helen Windsor (born 30 September 1992) is a British noblewoman and relative of the British royal family. Although she is a great-great-granddaughter of King George V, and a second cousin once removed of Charles III, she was removed from the line of succession to the British throne in 2008 after being confirmed into the Roman Catholic Church.

Early life and family  

Marina Charlotte Alexandra Katharine Helen Windsor was born on 30 September 1992 at the Rosie Hospital in Cambridge, Cambridgeshire. She is the second child of George Windsor, Earl of St Andrews, and Sylvana Tomaselli. She is a younger sister of Edward Windsor, Lord Downpatrick, and an older sister of Lady Amelia Windsor. She is a paternal granddaughter of Prince Edward, Duke of Kent, a first cousin of Elizabeth II, and Katharine, Duchess of Kent, the only daughter of Sir William Worsley, 4th Baronet. She is a maternal descendant of the Austrian Tomaselli family. Lady Marina is named after her great-grandmother Princess Marina of Greece and Denmark.

On 21 January 1993, Lady Marina was christened Marina Charlotte Alexandra Katharine Helen Windsor in a Church of England ceremony by William Booth, the sub-dean of the Chapel Royal at St James's Palace. Her godparents are Lady Ralph Kerr, Katherine Ruth Panter, William Hanbury-Tenison, and Sasha Poklewski-Koziell.

Succession rights 
Until 2008, Lady Marina was 25th in the line of succession to the British throne. She forfeited her place in the line of succession, in compliance of the Act of Settlement 1701, along with her older brother, after being confirmed into the Roman Catholic Church of her mother and paternal grandmother.

Personal life 
Lady Marina attended St Mary's School, Ascot, a Roman Catholic boarding school for girls.

In 2010, Lady Marina modelled for Hardy Amies in Tatler alongside her siblings. She later expressed interest in working in foreign diplomacy and not a modelling career.

In 2011, Lady Marina attended the wedding of her third cousin Prince William, Duke of Cambridge to Catherine Middleton.

In May 2012, Lady Marina travelled to Thailand, where she trained in Muay Thai boxing.

References 

Living people
1992 births
Converts to Roman Catholicism from Anglicanism
Daughters of British earls
English people of Austrian descent
English people of German descent
English people of Russian descent
English Roman Catholics
Marina Windsor
People educated at St Mary's School, Ascot
People from Cambridge